The Dr. Walter Warfield Building in Lexington, Kentucky, is a Second Empire or Georgian building constructed in 1806 on a corner of Jordan's Row, a string of buildings constructed or owned by John Jordan. Originally two stories, the brick building was expanded in 1870 with a third story that includes a Mansard roof and dormers. A later expansion added a 2-story annex to the building.

The building was constructed for Dr. Walter Warfield (June 17, 1760 – March 12, 1826), a physician who served in the Continental Army during the American Revolution and who was admitted as an original member of The Society of the Cincinnati in the state of Maryland.   Warfield was a distant cousin of Elisha Warfield, both descendants of John Warfield (1672-1718) of Anne Arundel County, Maryland. Walter Warfield was a professor of midwifery in the medical department of Transylvania University in 1801, but his tenure may have been brief. Prior to construction of the Warfield Building, he practiced "physic and surgery" at the former offices of Samuel Brown and Elisha Warfield. In 1807 Walter Warfield purchased 27,500 acres of land in Montgomery County, although he may not have lived there. The previous owner had been John Jordan, namesake of Jordan's Row.

References

External links

National Register of Historic Places in Lexington, Kentucky
Georgian architecture in Kentucky
Second Empire architecture in Kentucky
Commercial buildings completed in 1806
Commercial buildings in Lexington, Kentucky
Commercial buildings on the National Register of Historic Places in Kentucky
1806 establishments in Kentucky
Individually listed contributing properties to historic districts on the National Register in Kentucky